Ivenca is a village in the Municipality of Vojnik in eastern Slovenia. It lies on the main road towards Slovenske Konjice, just north of Vojnik. The area is part of the traditional region of Styria. It is now included with the rest of the municipality in the Savinja Statistical Region.

References

External links
Ivenca at Geopedia

Populated places in the Municipality of Vojnik